Janis Jérôme "J.J." Moser (born June 6, 2000) is a Swiss professional ice hockey defenceman currently playing for the  Arizona Coyotes of the National Hockey League (NHL). He was selected 60th overall in the 2021 NHL Entry Draft by the Coyotes.

Playing career
Moser started to play junior hockey at EHC Biel as a six year old. He captained their Junior Elite A team during his last junior season in 2017–18 and made his National League debut that same year, appearing in 2 games (1 assist) with EHC Biel. Moser started the 2018–19 season with Biel NL team and played 43 games (7 assists) and 12 playoffs games (2 assists). At the conclusion of the 2019 playoffs, he agreed to his first pro contract with Biel, signing a two-year deal on April 10, 2019. The contract contains an NHL-out clause for the 2020–21 season.

On October 13, 2020, Moser agreed to an early three-year contract extension to remain with EHC Biel through the 2023-24 season.

Following his selection in the second round of the 2021 NHL Entry Draft, on August 13, 2021, Moser was signed to a three-year entry-level contract by the Arizona Coyotes of the National Hockey League (NHL).

International play
Moser was named to Switzerland's under-20 team for the 2019 IIHF World Junior Championships in Vancouver, British Columbia, Canada. He played 7 games with the team, putting up 2 assists.

Moser made his debut with Switzerland men's national team in February 2019. He was later selected to play for Switzerland at the 2019 IIHF World Championship in Slovakia. Moser sustained a wrist injury during the third game of the WC against Austria, forcing him to sit out the remainder of the tournament.

Career statistics

Regular season and playoffs

International

References

External links

2000 births
Living people
Arizona Coyotes draft picks
Arizona Coyotes players
EHC Biel players
Sportspeople from the canton of Solothurn
Swiss ice hockey defencemen
Tucson Roadrunners players